Villa Cabrini Academy was a private Catholic elementary and high school for girls that operated from 1937 to 1970, under the authority of the Roman Catholic Archdiocese of Los Angeles.

The academy was located in Burbank, California, and served the Catholic population of the San Fernando Valley. It was sponsored by the Missionary Sisters of the Sacred Heart of Jesus, founded by St. Frances Xavier Cabrini, the first citizen of the United States to be declared a saint by the Catholic Church.

The school closed in June 1970. Its campus was first acquired by Los Angeles Lutheran High School in 1977 then acquired in the mid-1980s by Woodbury University, which moved its operations from its original urban site in Los Angeles to the grounds of the former high school in 1987. The academy chapel was converted into the university library, and the chapel's statues and stained-glass windows were re-installed at the Mother Cabrini Shrine on Colorado's Lookout Mountain.

Notable alumni
 Joan Freeman (actress)

References

Cabrini Sisters schools
Girls' schools in California
Defunct Catholic secondary schools in California
Educational institutions established in 1937
Educational institutions disestablished in 1970
Woodbury University
1937 establishments in California